Rick Cornacchia (born February 6, 1951) is an Italian-born Canadian ice hockey coach.

Cornacchia was the head coach of the Italy men's national ice hockey team at the 2010 IIHF World Championship.

He is the general manager of the National Training Rinks (NTR) in Richmond Hill, Ontario.

References

External links

1951 births
Living people
Canadian ice hockey coaches
Canadian ice hockey forwards
HC Alleghe players
Italian emigrants to Canada
Italy men's national ice hockey team coaches
Kingston Canadians coaches
Oshawa Generals coaches
Serie A (ice hockey) coaches